The Interparliamentary Assembly of Member Nations of the Commonwealth of Independent States (IPA CIS) is a parliamentary assembly for delegations from the national parliaments of the member countries of the CIS. The IPA CIS had its origins in the Supreme Soviet of the Soviet Union and was established on 27 March 1992 in Alma-ata (Kazakhstan) under the terms of the Agreement signed by Heads of founding parliaments. On 26 May 1995, CIS leaders signed the Convention on the Interparliamentary Assembly of Member Nations of the Commonwealth of Independent States eventually ratified by nine CIS parliaments. The overarching mission is law-making and alignment of national laws in the CIS. The IPA is housed in the Tauride Palace in a historical landmark of Saint Petersburg.

Mission
The IPA CIS acts as the consultative parliamentary body of the CIS established to discuss problems of parliamentary cooperation.

The activity of the IPA concentrates on the development of the model legislation, which could then be implemented by the Member States on the voluntary basis, and serve as a tool of dissemination of the best practices across the CIS. The Assembly is involved in the development of integration processes in the CIS. The IPA CIS regularly hosts specialized conferences, seminars and symposiums, which provide a platform for debate of the governmental and non-governmental actors.

Another mission of the IPA CIS is election monitoring. Monitoring is organized by the International Institute for the Monitoring of Democratic Development, Parliamentarism and Suffrage Protection of Citizens of IPA CIS Member Nations (IIMDD IPA CIS). It was established by the decision of the IPA CIS Council of 10 February 2006. In accordance with the invitation of the national election commission the IPA CIS form an international Observer Team in order to perform long- and short-term monitoring of the preparation and holding of the presidential and parliamentary elections. Together with experts, international observers from the IPA CIS analyze the electoral legislation to assess its consistency with international democratic elections standards, check availability and readiness of technical means necessary for the voting process, visit polling stations and summarize the results.

Membership
Member parliaments:
 Milli Mejlis of the Azerbaijan Republic
 National Assembly of Armenia
 National Assembly of the Republic of Belarus
 Parliament of the Republic of Kazakhstan
 Jogorku Kenesh of the Kyrgyz Republic
 Parliament of the Republic of Moldova
 Federal Assembly of the Russian Federation
 Majlisi Oli of the Republic of Tajikistan
 Verkhovna Rada of Ukraine (status unclear)
 Oliy Majlis of the Republic of Uzbekistan

Composition
The IPA CIS includes the delegations of the parliaments of its Member States and operates on the basis of consensus (each delegation is assigned one vote). A Parliamentary Delegation consists of representatives elected or appointed by the Parliament of a Member Nation. The IPA CIS also includes 10 Permanent Commissions:
 on Social Policy and Human Rights
 on Economy and Finance
 on Practices of State-Building and Local Government
 on Political Issues and International Cooperation
 on Agrarian Policy, Natural Resources and Ecology
 on Defense and Security Issues
 on Culture, Information, Tourism and Sport
 on Legal Issues
 on Science and Education
 Budget Oversight Commission
and Joint Commission at the IPA CIS for the Harmonization of National Laws Related to Security, Countering Emerging Threats and Challenges.

Their mandate is to draft model laws, recommendations and other legislative instruments for subsequent approval at the sessions of the IPA CIS Council and the Assembly.

IPA CIS Council consists of Heads of Chambers of National Parliaments and is responsible for the organization of work of the Assembly. The Council is presided over by the Chairperson. On 12 April 2018, the Speaker of the Federation Council of the Federal Assembly of the Russian Federation Valentina Matvienko has been reelected the Chairperson of the IPA CIS Council. The IPA CIS Council Secretariat is the permanent administrative body to assist the Assembly, the Assembly Council, permanent and ad hoc commissions. Secretary General – Head of the IPA CIS Council Secretariat is Yury Osipov.

The Assembly has established partnership and signed cooperation agreements with leading international bodies, such as the United Nations, Parliamentary Assembly of the Council of Europe, Parliamentary Assembly of the Organization for Security and Co-operation in Europe, Organization of the Black Sea Economic Cooperation, Parliamentary Assembly of the Mediterranean, World Intellectual Property Organization, International Federation of Red Cross and Red Crescent Societies, UNESCO, UNIDO, the Latin American Parliament, the Central American Parliament, the Pan-African Parliament and many others.

References

External links
 Interparliamentary Assembly of Member Nations of the Commonwealth of Independent States Website
 International Democracy Watch
 Federation Council of the Federal Assembly of the Russian Federation

Politics of Europe
Organizations established in 1992
Commonwealth of Independent States
Post-Soviet states